Mozaffar is a 1974 Iranian comedy film directed by Masoud Zelli and produced by Parviz Sayyad.

Cast
Parviz Sayyad as Mozaffar Pour Mozaffar
Mary Apick as Goli Abagoli
Nozar Azadi as Mohsen
Jahangir Forouhar as Motahhar Pour Motahhar
Mohammad Goudarzi as Mr. Abagoli
Paridokht Eghbalpour as Mrs. Abagoli
Mehri Vadadian as Mozaffar's mother
Ali Zahedi as Seyyed George
Parvin DOlatshahi as Motahhar's wife

References

External links
Mozaffar in IMDb

Iranian comedy films
1974 films
1970s Persian-language films
1974 comedy films
Iranian black-and-white films